Allerdyce is a name that may refer to two fictional characters:
John Allerdyce, known as "Pyro" in Marvel Comics' X-Men
Jebidiah Allerdyce "Cookie" Farnsworth, a role played by Jim Varney in Atlantis: The Lost Empire